Killer Rezzy is a New York City-based restaurant reservation service for Manhattan, Brooklyn and the Hamptons.

Killer Rezzy sells reservations for restaurants they partner with as well as restaurants they have no business agreement with. In the case of non-partner restaurants, the reservation will be under another customer's name. Some restaurants are bothered by Killer Rezzy selling reservations to their restaurant when free reservations can be made at OpenTable, Killer Rezzy has offered to remove restaurants upon request.

See also
 List of websites about food and drink

References

External links
 

Online retailers of the United States
Online food ordering